Richard Edgecombe (c. 1540 – after 1587), of Cotehele, Cornwall, was an English politician.

He was a Member (MP) of the Parliament of England for Totnes in 1563.

References

1540 births
Year of death missing
Members of the Parliament of England (pre-1707) for Totnes
English MPs 1563–1567